"Star Fleet" is the debut solo single by English musician Brian May, the lead guitarist of Queen. It is taken from the end theme of the cult science fiction puppet series Star Fleet.

It was also taken from the mini-album Star Fleet Project, which started out as a jam session involving May, Eddie Van Halen, drummer Alan Gratzer, bassist Phil Chen and keyboardist Fred Mandel over the days 21 and 22 April 1983.

Aside from the main participants, the title track also included backing vocals by Queen drummer Roger Taylor.

The main track, "Star Fleet", was edited down from the mini-album's length of eight minutes to a more radio-friendly 4:12. Shorter edits were also done for Argentinian and American promo releases. The British B-side, "Son of Star Fleet", is an instrumental consisting mainly of the sections edited out of the full version of the track for its single release.

Track listing
UK 7" Single
"Star Fleet" (Single Version) (Bliss) 4:12
"Son of Star Fleet" (May) 4:23

US 7" Single
"Star Fleet" (Single Version) (Bliss) 4:12
"Star Fleet" (US Promo Edit) (Bliss) 3:07

Personnel
Brian May - guitar, vocals, production
Eddie Van Halen - guitar, backing vocals
Alan Gratzer - drums
Phil Chen - bass guitar
Roger Taylor - backing vocals
Fred Mandel - keyboards
Reinhold Mack - mixing
 Mike Beiriger - engineering
 Nick Froome - additional engineering

References

External links
 MusicChain – Star Fleet Project – Brian May and Friends
 Brian May + Friends on Discogs

1983 songs
1983 debut singles
Brian May songs
Songs written by Brian May
EMI Records singles